Carversville is an unincorporated community and geographically isolated area in Solebury Township, Bucks County, Pennsylvania, United States, approximately 45 miles north of Philadelphia.  It was originally a Lenape gathering placed called Aquetong (translation: "many springs") more than 300 years ago the area's land was granted to James Harrison and Joseph Pike by William Penn. The Paunacussing Creek also called Fleecydale runs through Carversville and meets the Delaware River at Lumberville.

By 1730, roads had been formed into Carversville's dense forests so that settlers could haul out wool and farm produce and bring in lumber that had been rafted down the Delaware River from northern Pennsylvania.

Carversville was originally called Indian Village, though was later named Mill Town for the presence of its mills.  Its name was later contracted into Milton before finally, in 1833, being renamed Carversville in honor of the first postmaster, whose last name was Carver.

Carversville was a center of commerce from its inception, and boasted enterprises such as Stovers Mill, Fretz Mill, Carver Mill, Suggin Bag Manufactury, a sash and blind mill, and the famous Roram Hat factory.

In 1859, the Excelsior Normal Institute was founded on the hill that overlooks the village.  This five-story stone building became a well-known school which turned out scholars until it fell on hard times in the late nineteenth century.  When teaching ended, pleasure began as the building became a resort.  However, its lifespan was also short-lived.  The final use for the property was as the Carversville Christian Orphanage.  The building was razed in the mid-1900s.

Today, Carversville is home to some 100 residents, and is protected by a Historic District Ordinance which prevents the area from being marred by overdevelopment of new homes and businesses.  The center of Carversville, nicknamed the Town Square is home to the Carversville Inn, a restaurant which dates back to 1813, the dental office of Dr. Howard Barsky, and the Carversville General Store.  The Historic Carversville Society maintains an active schedule full of events for its residents, which includes Carversville Day (a town fair that includes the famed "pet parade"), Films in the Field (dated movies shown once per month during the summer that are projected on the side of the General Store), and carolling in the Square (where villagers gather in the Town Square to sing Christmas carols and visit Santa Claus).

Carversville was home to noted artist Charles Hargens famous for his cover art. Mr. Hargens painted covers for The Saturday Evening Post, Collier's, The Open Road for Boys and many western novels of the 1930s and 1940s.

In music, "Carversville" is the title of a song by the band Lincoln and during a concert in 1998, the band announced it to be specifically about Carversville, Pennsylvania.

The Bridge in Solebury Township and Carversville Historic District are listed on the National Register of Historic Places.

References

External links

 Community website

Unincorporated communities in Bucks County, Pennsylvania
Unincorporated communities in Pennsylvania